Aperostoma translucidum trinitense is a subspecies of tropical land snail with gills and an operculum, terrestrial gastropod mollusk in the family Neocyclotidae. 

This species is found in Trinidad, Tobago and the Paria Peninsula of Venezuela.

References

Neocyclotidae